Queensland Rail (QR) is a railway operator in Queensland, Australia.

History

Beginnings

Queensland Railways was the first operator in the world to adopt a narrow gauge (in this case ) for a main line, and this remains the systemwide gauge within Queensland today.

The colony of Queensland separated from New South Wales in 1859, and the new government was keen to facilitate development and immigration. Improved transport to the fertile Darling Downs region situated west of Toowoomba was seen as a priority. As adequate river transport was already established between the capital Brisbane and the then separate settlement of Ipswich, the railway commenced from the latter locality and the initial section, built over the relatively flat, easy country opened to Bigge's Camp, at the eastern base of the Little Liverpool Range, on 31 July 1865. Called the Main Line, the only significant engineering work on that section was the bridge over the Bremer River to North Ipswich.

Tunneling excavation through the Little Liverpool Range delayed the opening of the next section to Gatton by 10 months, but the line was opened to Toowoomba in 1867, the ascent of the Main Range being the reason for the adoption of narrow gauge.

The adoption of a narrow gauge was controversial at the time and was largely predicated by the government's desire for the fastest possible construction timeframe at the least cost. This resulted in the adoption of sharper curves and a lower axle load than was considered possible using the standard gauge, and an assessment at the time put the cost of a narrow gauge line from Ipswich to Toowoomba at 25% of the cost of a standard gauge line. In a colony with a non-indigenous population of 30,000 when the decision was made, it is understandable.

The network evolved as a series of isolated networks. It wasn't until the completion of the North Coast line in December 1924 that all were joined. The exception was the Normanton to Croydon line which always remained isolated. At its peak in 1932, the network totaled .

Changing transport patterns resulted in the closure of many development branch lines from 1948 onwards, but at the same time the main lines were upgraded to provide contemporary services, and from the 1970s an extensive network of new lines was developed, particularly to service export coal mines.

Electrification

Commencing in November 1979, the Brisbane suburban network was electrified.

In 1978, discussions were commenced on the possible electrification of the Blackwater and Goonyella coal networks. This was due to an expected increase in coal traffic across the networks, an ageing diesel-electric locomotive fleet and the increase in diesel fuel costs. By early 1983, a decision had been made to electrify the networks and by early 1984, contracts were already starting to be let for the new locomotives and other works for the project. The decision was made to electrify with the 25 kV AC railway electrification system as used on the Brisbane suburban network. This would allow future connection of the Brisbane network with the coal networks via the North Coast line.

The project was to be carried out in four stages:

 Stage 1: Electrification of the main line from Gladstone to Rockhampton, including parts of Rockhampton marshalling yard, then west to Blackwater and the coal mines in the area.

 Stage 2: Electrification of the coal lines south of Dalrymple Bay and Hay Point, then west through the Goonyella system, southwest to Blair Athol and south to Gregory – linking the Goonyella system to the Blackwater system.

 Stage 3: Electrification of the main western line from Burngrove to Emerald. This would allow electric freight from Rockhampton to Emerald.

 Stage 4: Electrification of the line from Newlands coal mine to Collinsville and northeast to Abbott Point. This stage never went ahead. In 1986, it was decided to electrify the North Coast line between Brisbane and Gladstone instead and this became known as Stage 4.

Interstate expansion

In September 1999, Queensland Rail was rebranded as QR. In March 2002, Queensland Rail purchased Northern Rivers Railroad and rebranded it Interail, fulfilling a long-held ambition of expanding beyond its state borders.

In March 2003, Queensland Rail entered the Hunter Valley coal market when Interail commenced a contract from Duralie Colliery to Stratford Mine. Another coal contract was won in late 2003 for the haulage of coal from Newstan Colliery, Fassifern to Vales Point Power Station. In 2004, Interail began running Brisbane to Melbourne and Sydney to Melbourne intermodal services. In June 2005, Queensland Rail acquired the CRT Group.

In June 2006, the Western Australian business of the Australian Railroad Group was purchased.

Privatisation and the current era

QR was responsible for all Queensland freight services, and from 2002 operated interstate services under the Australian Railroad Group, Interail and QR National brands. These were all spun out into a separate entity in July 2010, and later privatised as Aurizon.

In June 2009, the Queensland Government announced the privatisation of Queensland Rail's freight business. This resulted in Queensland Rail's freight assets being transferred to QR National (now Aurizon) from 1 July 2010.

In April 2013, the Queensland Parliament passed the Queensland Rail Transit Authority Bill 2013 that restructured Queensland Rail. The explanatory notes published for the bill outlined that the existing Queensland Rail Limited entity would remain although no longer be a government-owned corporation and that entity would become a subsidiary of a new Queensland Rail Transit Authority (QRTA), in effect creating a Queensland Rail group. Under the revised arrangements Queensland Rail Limited retained assets and liabilities and staff were transferred to the QRTA. As a result of transferring the staff to the QRTA, the government moved those employees from the federal industrial relations system to the state-based industrial relations system, giving the state more control over industrial arrangements. In November 2013, five labor unions commenced legal proceedings in the High Court of Australia alleging that the QRTA was subject to the federal industrial jurisdiction rather than the state system. In April 2015, the court ruled the QRTA was subject to the Fair Work Act 2009 and the federal industrial relations jurisdiction.

Company officers

Commissioners

The Commissioners of the Queensland Railways were:

 23 December 1863 – October 1864: Abraham Fitzgibbon
 28 October 1864 – 29 April 1869: Arthur Orpen Herbert

Note: from 29 April 1869 to 15 July 1870, the Secretary for Public Works was appointed Commissioner for Railways.

15 July 1870 – 12 March 1885: Arthur Orpen Herbert
 12 March 1885 – 29 July 1889: Francis W. Curnow

Note: from 29 July 1889 a Board of three Commissioners was appointed to reduce political influence. This was reduced back to a single Commissioner in September 1895.

 29 July 1889 – 30 June 1896: John Mathieson (Chief Commissioner)
29 July 1889 – September 1895: Robert John Gray (1st Assistant Commissioner)
29 July 1889 – 13 December 1894: Andrew Johnston (2nd Assistant Commissioner)
 1 July 1896 – 30 September 1902: Robert John Gray
5 November 1902 – 24 March 1911: James Forsyth Thallon
 30 March 1911 – 31 May 1911: Thomas Mulhall King
 1 June 1911 – 31 October 1918: Barnard Charles Evans
 1 November 1918 – 28 February 1938: James Walker Davidson
1 March 1938 – 28 February 1941: Curteis Anthony Murton
9 March 1941 – 27 February 1948: Percy Robert Turner Wills
1 March 1948 – 31 August 1952: Timothy Edward Maloney
1 September 1952 – 31 August 1962: Gerald Vincent Moriarty
September 1962 – 4 July 1976: Alva George Lee
5 July 1976 – 17 December 1982: Percy James Goldston
13 January 1983 – April 1986: Douglas Vernon Mendoza
20 May 1986 – 31 July 1989: Ralph T. Sheehy
1 August 1989 – December 1989: Ross William Dunning
December 1989 – 7 October 1990: Robin G. Read (Acting Commissioner)
8 October 1990 – 30 June 1991: Vincent John O'Rourke

Note: from 1 July 1991 the position of Commissioner for Railways ceased to exist, replaced by a Chief Executive Officer, reporting to a board of Directors.

Chief Executive Officers

Services

City network

QR operates urban and interurban rail and bus services throughout South East Queensland as part of the TransLink network. Rail services operate on twelve lines; Beenleigh, Caboolture, Cleveland, Doomben, Exhibition, Ferny Grove, Gold Coast, Ipswich-Rosewood, Redcliffe Peninsula, Shorncliffe, Springfield and Sunshine Coast. QR operate these with the Electric Multiple Units (EMU), Suburban Multiple Units (SMU), Interurban Multiple Units (IMU), InterCity Express (ICE) and New Generation Rollingstock (NGR) class electric multiple units.

Due to low patronage, the Corinda to Yeerongpilly and Doomben to Pinkenba lines have had their services replaced by buses, while due to track capacity constraints, services on the Sunshine Coast between Caboolture and Nambour are supplemented by a bus service. However, track duplication is currently underway, to improve the efficiency of the Sunshine Coast Line.

Long-distance trains
Queensland Rail operate these long-range passenger rail services

Electric Tilt Train: Brisbane to Rockhampton 
Spirit of Queensland: Brisbane to Cairns
Spirit of the Outback: Brisbane to Longreach
The Inlander: Townsville to Mount Isa
The Westlander: Brisbane to Charleville

Connecting road coach services are operated.

Annual patronage for these services in 2011/12 was 795,000. In 2007/08, the subsidy for the Brisbane-Cairns route was $130 million, or $900 per passenger. In 2001/02 it was $270 million.

Tourist trains
Queensland Rail also operate these tourist trains:
Gulflander: Normanton to Croydon
Kuranda Scenic Railway: Cairns to Kuranda

Former services
Queensland Rail operated many named trains including:
Capricornian: Brisbane to Rockhampton, operated from 1970 until 1993 when replaced by the Spirit of the Outback 
Great South Pacific Express: luxury train operated from 1999 until 2003
The Midlander: Rockhampton to Winton, operated from 1954 until 1993 when replaced by the Spirit of the Outback 
Savannahlander: Cairns to Forsayth, operated from 1995 until 2004 when contracted out to a private operator
Spirit of Capricorn: Brisbane to Rockhampton, operated from 1988 until 2003
The Sunlander: Brisbane to Cairns, operated from 1953 until 2014 when replaced by the Spirit of Queensland

Rolling stock
QR sourced steam locomotives from many manufacturers including Armstrong Whitworth, Avonside Engine Company, Beyer, Peacock & Company, Dübs & Co, Kitson & Co, Nasmyth, Wilson & Co, Neilson and Company, North British Locomotive Company, Vulcan Foundry and Yorkshire Engine Company all of the United Kingdom, Baldwin Locomotive Works of the United States, as well as Australian manufacturers Clyde Engineering, Evans, Anderson, Phelan & Co, Islington Railway Workshops, Newport Workshops, Phoenix Engine Company, Toowoomba Foundry and Walkers Limited. It also built some in-house at North Ipswich Railway Workshops.

In 1936, the company owned 750 locomotives, 67 railcars, 998 coaches, 94 mail cars, 177 brake vans and 18.699 goods wagons.

Dieselisation commenced in 1952 with early purchases being imported from GE Transportation and English Electric, before standardising on locally made products from A Goninan & Co, Clyde Engineering, English Electric and Walkers Limited. Electric locomotives were purchased from Clyde Engineering, Walkers Limited and Siemens. Electric multiple units have been purchased from Walkers Limited, Downer Rail and Bombardier Transportation, the latter of two which are still present in Queensland to this day.

With the closure of many rural branch lines in the 1990s there was excess motive power on the QR and it was chosen to standardise by using Clyde based diesel locomotives. Most, if not all of the English Electric locomotives were withdrawn by 2000.

In June 2021 QR announced that it had shortlisted 3 applicants (Alstom, CAF and Downer Rail) to manufacture 20 (later expanded to 65) new electric multiple units. These will allow for expansion of the fleet and retiring of the remaining EMU and ICE units.

 This table only includes locomotives owned by Queensland Rail. QR also hires locomotives from Aurizon as required.

Workshops
From its inception, QR's primary workshops were the North Ipswich Railway Workshops. It was replaced by the Redbank Railway Workshops in the 1960s.

Incident

Notable incidents involving Queensland Rail include:

 On 9 June 1925, 9 people were killed in an Accident near Traveston, atop a timber trestle bridge aboard the Rockhampton Mail service. The train was reported to have derailed, causing 2 cars (1 Passenger Car, and 1 Baggage Car) to fall into the Traveston Creek. The incident overall caused 9 Fatalities and over 50 Injuries.

 On 5 May 1947, a crowded charter train de-railed and crashed near Camp Mountain due to excessive speeds down a hill and a bend with 16 deaths.
On 25 February 1960, the East Bound Midlander Derailed and Crashed 1.5km away from Bogantungan (Located Between Emerald and Barcaldine) on the now called Spirit of the Outback Service. Floodwaters, had washed away a tree which hit some pylons holding the Medway Creek Bridge up. The East bound Train hauled by two C17 locomotives, at the time had 120 passengers on-board. When the service arrived at the bridge at 2:32am, it plunged 7 - 1/2M into the creek bed after the bridge gave way. Floodwater quickly filled carriages. Both locomotives ended up in the water, as well as three passenger cars. Overall, 7 People lost their lives and 43 people injured. The Medway Creek disaster is seen as the worst in QR's History.
 On 23 March 1985, two passenger trains collided head-on near Trinder Park station on the Beenleigh line. Two people died (one of whom was the driver of the south-bound train), and 31 people sustained injuries. Affected units EMU11 and EMU27 were both travelling concurrently on the single track section of the line, despite several "fail-safe" measures and the use of RCS (remote control signalling).
 On 21 September 2001, EMU units 05 and 60 collided with a cattle train near Petrie, causing two carriages of Unit 05 and one carriage of Unit 60 to be scrapped, with the three remaining carriages merged to form EMU 60.
 On 15 November 2004, a Diesel Tilt Train VCQ5 derailed at Berajondo on the North Coast line due to excessive speed resulting in injuries to over 100 people.
 On 14 September 2012, EMU41 collided with a heavy vehicle that became grounded on the level crossing at St Vincent's Road, Banyo, on the Shorncliffe line. The train driver performed all necessary braking measures, however they were not alerted in time and the train collided with the vehicle, causing extensive damage to the vehicle and the train (along with another train that was in the stationary near the crash). Injuries were sustained by both drivers.
 On 31 January 2013, IMU173 failed to stop at Cleveland station and collided with the station toilet block resulting in major damage to the train and minor injuries to several commuters and staff.
On 18 June 2021, A Queensland Rail operated Train - at the time being used for Driver Training Collided with a Loaded Aurizon Coal Train, at Westwood, West of Rockhampton. The Incident Occurred at 11:26am on an Aurizon operated trainline, the locomotive was travelling to Bluff. The Queensland Rail Locomotive had 3 Drivers onboard, 2 of which Suffered injuries. There was 1 Fatality. The QR locomotive 2471 sustained severe damage, with the Aurizon Locomotive sustaining less Substantial damage. A report of the incident is due in Q2 2022.

Criticism and controversy

Sunlander 14 

In December 2014 the Queensland Audit Office published a report about QR's Sunlander 14 project. The Sunlander 14 project had a scope to acquire a total of 25 carriages to replace The Sunlander passenger train with a new Diesel Tilt Train, purchase additional luxury cars, for the two existing Diesel Tilt Trains and refurbish their existing carriages.

The project was initially costed at $195 million and allowed for the operation of five services a week. However, costs had risen by 2012, and the Queensland Auditor-General reported that the eventual cost would be from $358 to $404 million, because QR had failed to take into account the requirement for upgraded maintenance facilities, as well as en route provisioning. The Auditor-General also believed, due to issues with the business case that QR had overestimated how popular the new service would be, and had a mistaken belief that the 'luxury' component of the train would attract more high-paying customers.

In 2013 the project was scaled back, with the train length being reduced to nine cars by removing the luxury sleepers and restaurant cars. That resulted in a revised project cost of $204 million. The Auditor-General's report in particular highlighted that due to the fixed-price construction contract the cost per train car increased and that opportunities were missed to pursue broader long distance train fleet renewal.

Redcliffe Peninsula railway line and subsequent driver shortages

The Redcliffe Peninsula railway line opened on 4 October 2016 and created a revised timetable that resulted in a 9% increase in services across the network. Queensland Rail did not have sufficient traincrew to operate the increased services. On 21 October a substantial interruption of service occurred involving the cancellation without notice of 167 services (12% of the scheduled services for the day) due to compulsory rest periods required for the train crew (a break of at least 32 hours required when a crew member has worked 11 consecutive days or 14 consecutive shifts).

Following the service interruptions the head of the train service delivery unit was stood down and an interim timetable implemented that reversed the increase in services and demand for traincrew. Several weeks after the service interruptions Queensland Rail CEO Helen Gluer announced her resignation from the company, along with chairman Michael Klug. It was announced on 27 October 2016, that the Director-General of the Department of Transport and Main Roads, Neil Scales, would replace Helen Gluer and that an inquiry known as the Queensland Rail Train Crewing Practices Investigation would be led by Phillip Strachan into the events.

On 25 December 2016 another substantial service cancellation event occurred due to a lack of available traincrew to operate the services. On that day 261 services, or 36% of scheduled services did not operate. The underlying reason for the cancellations was a lack of available drivers to operate services. Queensland Rail's Chief Operating Officer resigned several days later.

The inquiry into Queensland Rail's train crewing conducted by Phillip Strachan was completed in February 2017. The report made a number of findings and provided 36 recommendations that the Queensland Government accepted. The findings included that Queensland Rail had experienced a 9% increase in demand for traincrew due to the revised timetable while also experiencing a 7% decrease in traincrew productivity as a result of revised industrial arrangements, had intentionally operated for a number of years with an under-supply of traincrew and utilised the shortfall to provide paid overtime opportunities, had reduced traincrew intake during 2014-15 in the lead-up to the opening of the new line, had restrictions on external recruitment and had a longer driver training period than like organisations. The report also highlighted unclear governance arrangements and a short term focus within the operations section that relied on intuition rather than accurate forecasting and a reluctance to share bad news as contributing factors. The recommendations from the report centered around demand management, supply management, people and process management and governance arrangements.

Following the completion of the Strachan inquiry Philip Strachan was appointed as Chair of the Queensland Rail Board replacing Acting Chair Nicole Hollows, who had been appointed following the resignation Michael Klug. A Citytrain Response Unit was established within the Department of Transport and Main Roads to oversee the implementation of the recommendations from the Strachan inquiry. The Citytrain Response Unit subsequently commissioned a whole of business review into the organisation that was conducted by Deutsche Bahn and delivered in July 2017 and published reports tracking the progress of the implementation of the recommendations. Executive bonus payments were also suspended for 2017.

See also

Rail transport in Queensland
Aurizon

References

External links

Strachan Commission of Inquiry Report on Queensland Rail train crewing practices

 
Companies based in Brisbane
Government-owned companies of Queensland
Government railway authorities of Australia
Passenger railway companies of Australia
Railway companies established in 1865
Railway infrastructure companies of Australia
Rail transport in Queensland
Translink (Queensland)
1865 establishments in Australia
25 kV AC railway electrification
3 ft 6 in gauge railways in Australia